Kamil Szeremeta (born 11 October 1989) is a Polish professional boxer who held the European middleweight title from 2018 to 2019. As of June 2020, he is ranked as the world's seventh best active middleweight by The Ring and eighth by the Transnational Boxing Rankings Board.

Professional career
Szeremeta made his professional debut on 2 December 2012, scoring a four-round points decision (PTS) victory over Janos Lakatos at the OSiR Huragan Arena in Wołomin, Poland.

After compiling a record of 16–0 (2 KOs) he was due to face European middleweight champion, Emanuele Blandamura. After Blandamura relinquished the European title to face WBA (Regular) middleweight champion Ryōta Murata, Szeremeta faced Alessandro Goddi for the vacant European title on 23 February 2018 at the Palasport V.le Tiziano in Rome, Italy. Szeremeta defeated Goddi, capturing the title via second-round technical knockout (TKO). 

He made two successful defences of the title – a tenth-round knockout (KO) against Ruben Diaz in September and a unanimous decision (UD) against Andrew Francillette in March 2019 – followed by an eight-round UD victory in a non-title fight against Edwin Palacios in July. Szeremeta was due to face mandatory challenger Matteo Signani, but chose to relinquish his European title in order to face Oscar Cortés in a final eliminator for the IBF middleweight title. The bout took place on 5 October 2019 at Madison Square Garden in New York City, as part of the undercard for the vacant IBF title fight between Gennady Golovkin and Sergiy Derevyanchenko. Szeremeta defeated Cortés via second round TKO to set up a fight with Golovkin, who defeated Derevyanchenko to capture the IBF title.

The fight against Golovkin took place on 18 December 2020 in Hollywood, Florida, with Golovkin's IBF and IBO middleweight titles on the line. Szeremeta was unable to overcome the odds, and was dropped by his opponent four times over the course of the fight. After seven rounds, Szeremeta did not come out for the eighth, losing by seventh-round corner retirement and suffering his first professional loss.

On 19 June 2021, Szeremeta faced undefeated Jaime Munguía on short notice. Despite never being knocked down in the bout, Szeremeta was outgunned and could not match the damage that Munguía was inflicting. He suffered a second successive corner retirement loss, this time after six rounds.

Professional boxing record

References

Living people
1989 births
Polish male boxers
Sportspeople from Białystok
Middleweight boxers
European Boxing Union champions